The Graystone Ballroom was a dance hall located at 4237 Woodward Avenue in Detroit, Michigan, United States. Billed as "Detroit's Million Dollar Ballroom", it opened its doors on March 7, 1922 with a floorplan designed to hold 3,000 people, making it the largest ballroom of the city at that point. It would become one of the six great ballrooms of the city before the stock market crash of 1929 put a halt to new construction. The others were the Jefferson Ballroom, the Grande Ballroom, the Monticello Ballroom, the Beach Ballroom, the Vanity Ballroom, and the Mirror Ballroom.

In 1980, after decades of decay, neglect, and occupation by vandals, the building was demolished to make way for a McDonald’s location which still stands today.

References

External links
Historic Detroit — Graystone Ballroom

Demolished buildings and structures in Detroit
1922 establishments in Michigan
Buildings and structures demolished in 1980
Buildings and structures completed in 1922
1972 disestablishments in Michigan